Atypical polypoid adenomyoma (APA) is a rare benign tumour of the uterus.


Pathology
APAs are characterized by glands with abnormal shapes that: (1) often have squamous metaplasia, and (2) are surrounded by benign smooth muscle. Nuclear atypia, if present, is mild.  

The microscopic differential diagnosis includes endometrial carcinoma and endocervical adenocarcinoma.

See also
Adenomyoma
Cervical cancer

References

Benign neoplasms
Noninflammatory disorders of female genital tract